The 2006 Chinese Super League was the third season since the establishment of the Chinese Football Association Super League (中国足球协会超级联赛 or 中超), also known as Chinese Super League, the thirteen season of professional association football league and the 45th top-tier league season in China. The premier football league in China under the auspices of the Chinese Football Association the season started on March 11, 2006, and ended on October 22, where it was planned that would be two teams relegated at the end of the season, however this was changed to one when Sichuan First City folded before the start of the season.

Promotion and relegation
Teams promoted from 2005 China League One
Xiamen Blue Lions
Changchun Yatai

Teams relegated after end of 2005 Chinese Super League
None

Preseason

A number of changes occurred during the off season, notably some major changes to the teams. Inter Shanghai was moved to Xi'an and was renamed Xi'an Chanba. Shanghai Zobon was renamed Shanghai United.

Beijing Hyundai, who may not renew their contract with Hyundai motors, change their team name back to their formal name, Beijing Guoan.

Shenzhen Jianlibao changed its team name to Shenzhen Kingway after finding a new sponsor in Kingway brewery.

There was also some speculation that Liaoning FC would pull out from the league, and that the Chinese Football Association had prepared a schedule with only 14 teams should Liaoning have withdrawn.

The biggest shock was the disbanding of Sichuan First City in January, so the league will only have 15 teams at the start of the season, 1 short of the 16 teams planned.

Player transfers

Shanghai Shenhua, who qualify for the AFC Champions League, boost their squad with Li Weifeng from the debt-ridden Shenzhen Jianlibao for 6.5 million RMB, the highest transfer fee this season. In additional, Shenhua bought over Liu Yunfei from Tianjin Teda for 0.9 million and recalled defender Du Wei from Glasgow Celtic.

Desperately in need of money, Shenzhen Jianlibao was also forced to sell China's first choice goalkeeper, Li Leilei to Shandong Luneng Taishan for 5 million; Former national striker Yang Chen to the newly promoted Xiamen Lanshi for 2 million and Zhou Ting to Beijing Hyundai for 3.5 million.

Other notable transfers includes Wang Liang's 5 million move from Liaoning FC to Shandong, An Qi's 4 million move from defending champions Dalian Shide to Xiamen and An Shuai, Zhou Yi, Sun Bing, Cha Kejun's four players move from Shandong to Qingdao Jonoon for 1 million each.

The season
Shandong Luneng and newcomer Changchun Yatai both had a good spell early on while defending champions Dalian struggled early on. During the mid season, Changchun finally cannot kept up with the pace of the top league and gradually drops to fourth in the league. Meanwhile, a record 13 league win in a row saw Shandong Luneng Taishan gaining an unassailable lead at the top. With Shandong the clear winner, the interest in the second half of the season was the race to the second place and the fight against relegation.

In the end, Chongqing Lifan was relegated with 2 games to go while the race for second went all the way down to the wire before Shanghai Shenhua clinch the second spot with a last day win over Liaoning while Beijing slips.

League table

Top scorers

Attendances

League
Total attendance: 2,228,300 
Average attendance: 10,611

Clubs

See also
Chinese Super League
Football in China
Chinese Football Association
Chinese Football Association Jia League
Chinese Football Association Yi League
Chinese FA Cup

References

External links
 Results and table on RSSSF 
 2006 Chinese Super League  on Csl.sports.cn 
 2006 Chinese Super League on sports.cn.yahoo.com 

Chinese Super League seasons
1
China
China